Centrocerum divisum is a species of beetle in the family Cerambycidae. It was described by Martins and Monné in 1975.

References

Elaphidiini
Beetles described in 1975